The Peddler and the Lady (Italian title: Campo de' fiori) is a 1943 Italian comedy film directed by Mario Bonnard and starring Aldo Fabrizi, Caterina Boratto and Anna Magnani.

 Much of the film is set on the Campo de' Fiori in Rome where Elide a greengrocer is in love with a fishmonger who works nearby, but he is more interested in another woman.

Cast
 Aldo Fabrizi as Peppino Corradini  
 Caterina Boratto as Elsa Bianchini  
 Anna Magnani as Elide  
 Peppino De Filippo as Aurelio  
 Cristiano Cristiani as Il piccolo Carletto  
 Olga Solbelli as Olga  
 Rina Franchetti as Rosa, la domestica di Olga  
 Guglielmo Barnabò as Il signore grasso sul treno  
 Ciro Berardi as Sor Eugenio  
 Giulio Calì as L'uomo che chiede le alicette  
 Lia Campomori as La suora del carcere 
 Olga Capri as Peppa, la portiera 
 Olga Vittoria Gentilli as Leila, la giocatrice al tavolo di baccarat 
 Gorella Gori as La balia  
 Luana Lori as La domestica venuta al mercato  
 Enrico Luzi as Un giocatore al tavolo di baccarat  
 Alfredo Martinelli as Un giocatore al tavolo di baccarat 
 Guido Morisi as Giorgio  
 Pina Piovani as Una popolana ai mercanti generali  
 Checco Rissone as Giovanni
 Gioconda Stari as La domestica del nuovo appartamento 
 Gianrico Tedeschi as Un giocatore al tavolo di baccarat 
 Saro Urzì

References

Bibliography 
 Reich, Jacqueline & Garofalo, Piero. Re-viewing Fascism: Italian Cinema, 1922-1943. Indiana University Press, 2002.

External links 

1943 films
Italian comedy films
1943 comedy films
1940s Italian-language films
Films directed by Mario Bonnard
Italian black-and-white films
Films with screenplays by Marino Girolami
Films shot in Rome
1940s Italian films